Olla is a 2019 drama film, written and directed by Ariane Labed, starring Romanna Lobach and Grégoire Tachnakian. It follows Olla, a woman from eastern Europe, who responds to an advertisement on a dating site. She then moves in with Pierre, who lives with his elderly mother in a suburb of France.

Filming 
Filming of Olla took place primarily in Nevers, France.

Critical response 
The film has been selected in film festivals:
 Canne's Directors' Fortnight
 BFI London Film Festival
Telluride Film Festival
 Sundance Film Festival
 Clermont-Ferrand International Short Film Festival

And won:
Grand Prize, SACD Best Fiction Award, and Students' Price at Clermont-Ferrand International Short Film Festival
Best Comedy Short, Crested Butte Film Festival
Louis le Prince Prize for Best Short Film at Leeds International Film Festival
Best Actress for Romana Lobach at Aguilar Film Festival
Best Film & SACD prize at Clermont-Ferrand International Short Film Festival

References

External links
 

2019 films
French drama films
2010s French films